The Pulitzer Prize for Illustrated Reporting and Commentary is one of the fourteen Pulitzer Prizes that is annually awarded for journalism in the United States. It is the successor to the Pulitzer Prize for Editorial Cartooning awarded from 1922 to 2021.

History
It has been awarded since 1922 for a distinguished editorial cartoon or portfolio of cartoons published during the year, characterized by originality, editorial effectiveness, quality of drawing, and pictorial effect.

Since 1980, finalists (usually two) have been announced in addition to the winner.

Only two comic strips have been awarded the prize: Doonesbury by Garry Trudeau in 1976 and Bloom County by Berkeley Breathed in 1987. 

No winner was selected in 2021, which drew controversy. In 2022, the prize was superseded by the revamped category of Illustrated Reporting and Commentary.

List of winners

Repeat winners

Through 2017, eighteen people have won the Editorial Cartooning Pulitzer twice, and five of those have won it three times.

Nelson Harding is the only cartoonist to have won the prize in two consecutive years, 1927 and 1928.

References

Further reading
This book chronologically states the awards, displays the artwork, and then describes the cartoon:
 

Editorial Cartooning
Editorial cartooning awards
Awards established in 1922